Hoàng Mai is a district-level town (thị xã) of Nghệ An province, in the North Central Coast region of Vietnam.

The town was founded on 3 April 2013 on the basis of separation from Quỳnh Lưu District.

Administrative divisions

5 phường (urban wards):

 Mai Hùng
 Quỳnh Dị
 Quỳnh Phương
 Quỳnh Thiện
 Quỳnh Xuân

5 xã (suburbs communes):

 Quỳnh Lập
 Quỳnh Liên
 Quỳnh Lộc
 Quỳnh Trang
 Quỳnh Vinh

Populated places in Nghệ An province
Districts of Nghệ An province
County-level towns in Vietnam

vi:Hoàng Mai